Lalisa Manobal (also spelled Manoban; born Pranpriya Manobal;  March 27, 1997), known mononymously as Lisa, is a Thai rapper, singer and dancer. She is a member of the South Korean girl group Blackpink formed by YG Entertainment.

Lisa made her solo debut with her single album Lalisa in September 2021. The album sold over 736,000 copies in its release week in South Korea, making her the first female artist to do so. The music video for its lead single of the same name recorded 73.6 million views on YouTube in first 24 hours of its release, becoming the most-viewed music video in the first 24 hours on the platform by a solo artist. Both "Lalisa" and the album's second single "Money" were top-ten hits on the Billboard Global 200.

Lisa has earned several accolades, including five Guinness World Records, a Mnet Asian Music Award, a Gaon Chart Music Award, and the first MTV Video Music Award and MTV Europe Music Award ever won by a K-pop soloist. She is one of the most influential K-pop idols globally, and has been the most-followed K-pop idol on Instagram since 2019.

Life and career

1997–2010: Early life
Born as Pranpriya Manobal on March 27, 1997 in Buriram Province, Thailand, she later legally changed her name to Lalisa, meaning the one being praised, on the advice of a fortune teller in order to bring in prosperity. As an only child, she was raised by her Thai mother and Swiss stepfather. Lisa's mother is named Chitthip Brüschweiler. Her stepfather is Marco Brüschweiler, a chef, currently active in Thailand. Lisa completed secondary education at Praphamontree School I and II.

After starting dance classes at the age of four, she competed regularly in dance contests throughout her childhood, including in "To Be Number One", and joined the eleven-member dance crew We Zaa Cool alongside BamBam of Got7. In September 2009, the group entered the competition LG Entertainment Million Dream Sanan World broadcast on Channel 9 and won the "Special Team" Award. Lisa also participated in a singing contest as a school representative for "Top 3 Good Morals of Thailand", hosted by the Moral Promotion Center in early 2009, where she finished as a runner-up.

2012–2015: Pre-debut 
In 2010, 13-year-old Lisa auditioned to join South Korean record label YG Entertainment in Thailand. From a young age, Lisa gained an interest in K-pop idols, namely admiring artists Big Bang and 2NE1, and wished to someday follow a similar path. Among the 4,000 applicants, she was the only individual to qualify, which prompted then CEO, Yang Hyun-suk into offering Lisa a chance to become a YG Entertainment trainee. Lisa also impressed one of the judges, Danny Im of 1TYM, at the auditions, with him later praising her on-stage confidence and her off-stage attitude.

In 2011, Lisa moved to South Korea to begin her formal training as a trainee, which lasted five years. She officially joined the label as their first non-ethnically Korean trainee on April 11, 2011. In November 2013, she appeared in Taeyang's music video for the single "Ringa Linga" as a background dancer, alongside members of iKon and Winner. In March 2015, Lisa undertook her first modelling job for street-wear brand Nona9on, following South Korean cosmetics brand Moonshot in 2016.

2016–present: Debut with Blackpink and solo ventures 

In August 2016, Lisa debuted as one of four members of South Korean girl group Blackpink, as well as the first non-ethnically Korean to debut under the agency. Blackpink debuted with single album Square One with lead singles "Whistle" and "Boombayah". "Whistle" achieved a perfect "all-kill", topping all South Korean charts upon debut. As of September 2022, the group has released three studio albums, Blackpink in Your Area, The Album and Born Pink, three extended plays, Blackpink, Square Up and Kill This Love, and two single albums, Square One and Square Two.

Lisa was cast by the MBC military variety program Real Man 300 as a permanent member on the show as part of the Korea Army Academy edition from September 21, 2018, onward. The show marked her first permanent role on a television program since debut. Her appearance earned her an unofficial award titled "Character of the Year" through the 2018 MBC Entertainment Awards.

On November 5, 2018, she unveiled her YouTube channel, Lilifilm Official, focusing on travelling and lifestyle alongside dance performances. As of July 2019, she accumulated over 1.3 million subscribers, and received a YouTube Gold Play Button. Notably, one of the dance performance videos went viral in 2020 due to a meme where screen caps of her legs were juxtaposed onto a character or public figure's torso, often with the caption "Did it work?". Celebrities including Dolly Parton, Stephen Colbert. James Corden, Luke Evans, and Lil Nas X participated in the meme as well, posting photos of themselves with Lisa's legs.

In March 2020, Lisa served as the dance mentor throughout the iQIYI's Chinese girl group survival program Youth With You Season 2. In February 2021, she returned as the dance mentor in the Chinese boy group survival show Youth With You Season 3.

On April 19, 2021, an official from YG Entertainment revealed to South Korean media outlet The Korea Herald that Lisa would debut as the third soloist from her group with schedules later to be officially announced through a notice. On July 12, through Star News, her label revealed filming for her music video is going underway.

Lisa's debut single album Lalisa and its lead single of the same name were released on September 10, 2021. Upon release, the music video for "Lalisa" became the most-viewed video by a soloist in 24 hours with 73.6 million views, breaking the record held by Taylor Swift's "Me!" featuring Brendon Urie, which received 65.2 million views in 24 hours, for which she earned two Guinness World Records. The song debuted at number 84 on the US Billboard Hot 100 and at number two on the Billboard Global 200, becoming Lisa's first top-ten hit on the latter. The single album sold 736,221 copies in Korea on the first week of release, setting the record for the highest first-week sales among all female artists and making Lisa the first female soloist to achieve 500,000 copies in first-week sales. Following its success, B-side track "Money" was sent as the album's second single to US contemporary hit radio and peaked at number 90 on the Billboard Hot 100 and at number ten on the Billboard Global 200, earning Lisa her second career entries on both charts and her second top-ten global hit.

In October 2021, Lisa confirmed her collaboration with DJ Snake, Ozuna, and Megan Thee Stallion by dropping a teaser of the song. Entitled "SG", it included songwriting and composing credits for Lisa and was released on October 22 alongside the music video. The collaboration debuted at number 19 on the Billboard Global 200 and at number two on the US Bubbling Under Hot 100 chart, and became her first number-one song on the Latin Airplay chart.

On August 28, 2022, Lisa won the MTV Video Music Award for Best K-Pop Video for "Lalisa" and became the first solo K-pop artist in history to win an MTV Video Music Award. On November 13, Lisa was awarded the MTV Europe Music Award for Best K-pop and became the first solo K-pop artist in history to win an MTV Europe Music Award as well.

Personal life
Lisa is multilingual; she speaks fluent Thai, English, and Korean, along with basic Japanese and Chinese. She is based in South Korea.

Other ventures

Endorsements 

Through her work as a model for the South Korean cosmetics brand Moonshot, she became their brand ambassador in China on March 21, 2018.

On July 25, 2019, Lisa became the brand ambassador and presenter exclusively for the new collection launched in Thailand where six of the products include Manoban's signature as part of the packaging. On March 28, 2019, Lisa signed her first solo endorsement deal for AIS Thailand, the largest GSM mobile phone operator in Thailand. Lisa became the highest-paid brand presenter for AIS. Furthermore, her advertising campaign became the highest-rated commercial in Thailand. On May 11, 2019, Lisa became the brand presenter for the Samsung Galaxy S10 in Thailand. Her first promotional material for the brand was released on May 14. The mobile game Ragnarok M: Eternal Love uses Lisa as their endorsement model and appears as a character on their "Midnight Party" server from July 24, 2019, onward.

In January 2020, Lisa joined labelmate Winner's Mino as an endorsement model for sportswear brand Adidas's SS20 season My Shelter clothing range. Through Lisa's newfound popularity in China through her appearance on iQIYI's Youth With You 2 as a dance mentor, she was revealed to be the new brand spokesperson in China for the fabric softener company D&G Downy on May 13. She soon went on to become the new brand spokesperson for one of China's largest dairy companies, Mengniu Dairy's Chinese yoghurt brand, Zhengouli. On June 27, Tencent Games announced Lisa as Supercell's newest spokesperson in China for their mobile video game, Brawl Stars. In October 2020, Lauder-owned MAC had named Lisa as their newest global brand ambassador. She became the face of their renowned collections and key campaigns as well as muse for innovation projects. "Always confident and never one to shy away from risks, she embodies our commitment to celebrating individuality and self-expression above all else," explained Senior Vice President and Global Creative Director, Drew Elliott. "We can't wait for her fans to see what she has in store for them through our collaboration".

On February 22, 2021, Lisa was announced as the endorser of the Vivo S9 smartphone. She was also an endorser of the Vivo S7 smartphone in 2020. In March 2022, Lisa became the brand ambassador to whiskey brand Chivas Regal and starred in "I Rise, We Rise" campaign.

Fashion and photography

In January 2019, Lisa became the muse of Hedi Slimane, the artistic, creative and image director for Celine, a French luxury brand. In September 2020, she was announced as their global ambassador. She was featured in the brand's Essentials campaign in June 2020, shot by creative director Hedi Slimane and has been widely photographed in Celine outfits and accessories. In a statement, the brand said, “We are pleased to announce the continued collaboration of Celine with Lisa, who will represent the house as Global Ambassador”.

The same year, in November, Penshoppe revealed Lisa had joined the Penshoppe family as their newest ambassador. Furthermore, on July 24, 2020, Lisa was officially selected as the newest brand ambassador representing Bulgari, an Italian luxury brand. As an ambassador for Bulgari, she participated in the digital campaigns for the "Serpenti" and "Bzero One" collections.

On February 16, 2021, Lisa joined the guest jury for the French fashion award ANDAM.

Through YG Entertainment, Lisa released a limited edition photobook entitled "0327" composed entirely with self-taken photographs through a film camera. The photobook was released on her birthday in 2020. The second volume was released the following year on March 27, 2021.

On November 13, 2021, it was revealed that Lisa would be releasing her own collection with American beauty brand MAC Cosmetics, titled “MAC x L”. Her collection includes powder blushes, eyeliner, an eyeshadow palette, and a face powder.

Philanthropy
On September 17, 2019, after torrential rain brought by a monsoon caused flooding across 32 Thai provinces, Thai beauty blogger Koi Onusa, a relative of Lisa, revealed that Lisa had donated ฿100,000 to Thai actor Bin Bunluerit's fund to help those evacuated in the floods as disaster relief.

In September 2021, Lisa expressed an interest in joining a social program led by the Korean Foundation for International Cultural Exchange in partnership with YG Entertainment for Buriram Province, and soon launched an online account to help collect donations. The partnership between the foundation and YG Entertainment aims to build a 160 square meter cultural compound at Non Suwan Phitthayakhom School in Buriram, among other things which includes providing computers, projectors and other multimedia equipment to the school and establish a K-pop dance academy staffed by local instructors.

Impact and influence

Lisa has often been cited as an influence to other individuals working in the same field as a musician within the South Korean music industry. Through interviews, former Nature girl group member, Gaga and Hot Issue girl group member, Mayna revealed Lisa as their role models.

In April 2019, she became the most followed K-pop idol on Instagram, with 17.4 million followers at the time. As of April 2021, she became the first and only K-pop idol to amass 50 million followers, as she continues to set engagement and follower count records on the platform.

While Lisa landed her first solo magazine cover for Harper's Bazaar Thailand's May 2019 issue, MEI, a distributor of Harper's Bazaar, reported that all 120,000 printed copies in stock were sold out. It was reported that, on average, 30,000 copies are normally printed, and well-known celebrities have an average of 60,000 copies printed. However, despite selling 120,000 copies, the public's demand was still not met.

Following Lisa's attendance at the Celine Fashion Show for Men's Spring Summer 2020 collection in Paris, France, during Paris Fashion Week, Lyst reported that global searches for Celine's Triomphe bag leapt 66% on June 28, 2019, after she published an image of the style on her social media, in result garnering the attention of many among the general public.

According to the "2021 Overseas Korean Wave Survey" conducted by the organization's Ministry of Culture, Sports and Tourism and Korea Foundation for International Cultural Exchange, Lisa was listed as one of twenty "Most Popular Korean Singers Abroad" alongside South Korean musicians G-Dragon, IU, Psy, Blackpink and more. The survey collected data throughout 18 countries worldwide including China, India, Australia, South Africa and Russia. A total of 8,500 men and women aged between 15 and 59 participated in the survey. In a 2021 survey conducted by YouGov, a British international agency, Lisa was chosen as one of the twenty most admired women in the world alongside Michelle Obama, Angelina Jolie, Queen Elizabeth II, and more.

Lisa's announcement as MAC Cosmetics’ first female K-pop idol to be appointed as a Global Brand Ambassador generated $1.83M in MIV®, with MAC's announcement post generating $506K in MIV® – representing their top branded post of 2020 and making them one of the top beauty collaborations of the year. Her announcement post on Instagram as a Global Ambassador for MAC Cosmetics received more than 5.6 million likes and 74,000 comments. Her partnerships have been noted to feel genuine as she frequently features the same brands across her social media channels. The success of her endorsements and partnerships has been partially attributed to this authenticity. Because of her influencing power and marketing potential, Lisa has been used as an example of changing promotional strategies in the fashion and makeup industry.

Her impact extends to other artists in the music industry. Destiny Rogers' song "Tomboy" had a 1939% increase in streams on the daily Spotify update following a dance performance video by Lisa on her YouTube channel using it. Shortly after the performance was uploaded to YouTube, Rogers' song and EP Tomboy entered iTunes and Apple Music charts in numerous countries. On Spotify the song reached the Top 200 and the top 10 of the Philippines Viral 50 playlist. Rogers herself acknowledged the situation on Twitter and thanked Lisa for revitalizing the song. Lisa was praised by Thailand's prime minister, Prayut Chan-o-cha, for promoting Thai culture in her "Lalisa" music video.

Discography

Single albums

Singles

Songwriting credits

Videography

Music videos

Other videos

Filmography

Television shows

Awards and nominations

Listicles

World records

Notes

References

External links 

 
 
 

1997 births
Living people
People from Buriram province
21st-century Thai women singers
K-pop singers
Korean-language singers of Thailand
Thai rappers

YG Entertainment artists
Blackpink members
Thai expatriates in South Korea
Dance-pop musicians
World record holders